Chen Szu-yu (born 1 August 1993) is a Taiwanese table tennis player. She competed for Taiwan at the 2012,
2016, and 2020 Summer Olympics. Chen is a two-time medalist at the World Team Championships as a member of the Chinese Taipei women's team.

References

External links
 
 

1993 births
Living people
Olympic table tennis players of Taiwan
Table tennis players at the 2012 Summer Olympics
Table tennis players at the 2016 Summer Olympics
Table tennis players at the 2020 Summer Olympics
Taiwanese female table tennis players
Table tennis players at the 2014 Asian Games
Universiade medalists in table tennis
Table tennis players at the 2018 Asian Games
Universiade silver medalists for Chinese Taipei
Asian Games competitors for Chinese Taipei
Expatriate table tennis people in Japan
Medalists at the 2011 Summer Universiade
Medalists at the 2013 Summer Universiade
Medalists at the 2015 Summer Universiade
Medalists at the 2017 Summer Universiade
World Table Tennis Championships medalists
21st-century Taiwanese people